Ibrahim Khalil (1909 – 7 April 1998) was an Egyptian diver. He competed at the 1936 Summer Olympics in Berlin, where he placed 13th in 10 metre platform.

References

External links

1909 births
1998 deaths
Egyptian male divers
Olympic divers of Egypt
Divers at the 1936 Summer Olympics
20th-century Egyptian people